Höglwörther See is a lake in Bavaria, Germany.
The Höglwörth Abbey was founded in 1125 on an island in the lake, now a peninsula due to silting.

References 

Lakes of Bavaria